The fifth season of the Kannada-language version of Indian reality television series Bigg Boss premiered on 15 October 2017.
Sudeep reprised his role as the host of the show.

The finale of the season took place 28 January 2018, and rapper Chandan Shetty was declared the winner of the show and was awarded the prize money of 50 lakh. Sales representative Diwaker was voted the runner-up.

Production 
Sudeep had signed a  deal with the channel Colors Kannada to host the next five seasons starting from the previous season. During the grand finale of Season 4, it was announced that the next season will start with new contestants and a renovated Bigg Boss house built for the previous season in the Innovative Film City at Bidadi, Bangalore. This will be the first season to allow non-celebrities to the Bigg Boss house with online auditions taking place from July 2017.

The application process of the auditions for non-celebrities was exclusively carried by mobile app called Voot. Nagendra Bhat Bilalige (Naabhi) was the reality writer for this season.

The show was extended by one week (106 days) instead of 98 days. Among the five finalists Niveditha and Diwakar are auditioned contestants, where as Chandan, Karthik and Shruti are celebrities.

Housemates status

Housemates 
Along with the usual celebrity contestants, the housemates of this season includes contestants selected through online audition process. The total of 17 housemates include 11 celebrities and 6 commoners.
Nagendra bhat bilalige was the writer for this season.

Wild-card entries

Three contestants entered the house through wild cards. Presenter Akul Balaji was the second entrant who promoted his new dance reality television reality show Master Dancer. Actresses Lasya and Samyuktha Hegde were the final two entrants. Hegde was evicted from the house a few days later after she assaulted Sameer Acharya for allegedly touching her inappropriately. However, later she admitted in the confession room that Acharya was not at fault and that she reacted at the "heat of the moment".

Celebrities claim to fame
 Shruti Prakash – television actress and singer. She is known for her role of Sita Modi in the Star Plus popular show Saath Nibhaana Saathiya which starred Devoleena Bhattacharjee and Mohammad Nazim.
 Karthik Jayaram – Actor, Model and engineer. He is known for appearing in many Sandalwood films like Varadanayaka and Care of Footpath 2. He also is well known for playing Ravana in Star Plus popular show Siya Ke Ram.
 Tejaswini Prakash – Actress and model. She is known for appearing in Sandalwood films like Savi Savi Nenapu and Preethi Nee Heegeke.
 Krishi Thapanda – Model and actress. She is known for making her Bollywood film debut with Akira in 2016 with Anish Tejeshwar.
 Chandan Shetty – Rapper. He is known for singing many songs for Sandalwood films.
 Sihi Kahi Chandru – Television actor and presenter. He appeared in many Sandalwood films like Josh, Julie, Naanu Nanna Kanasu. He also played the main lead in the show Sihi Kahi.
 Samyuktha Hegde – Actress. She is known for appearing in the Sandalwood film Kirik Party. She participated in MTV Roadies.

Episodes
The episodes were broadcast on Colors Super between 8:00 and 9:30 p.m. (IST) daily. The episodes and highlights were also released on the website and app Voot after the telecast.

Nominations table

Notes

 This housemate was the current House Captain.
 This Housemate was directly nominated for eviction by Bigg Boss.
 This Housemate was granted immunity from nominations.
 This Housemate was Ejected from the house.

: As the captain, Anupama had the power to directly nominate one housemate, and she picked Niveditha's name for eviction.
: Chandru had a Special Adhikara to nominate 3 housemates instead of two. Captain Shruti had the power to save one nominated housemate, and she decided to save Karthik.
: Diwakar and Shruti were directly nominated by Bigg Boss. Sameer became the first captain as a commoner. Anupama was directly nominated by Sameer.
: Sameer had a Special Adhikara to nullify the nominations made by one housemate, and he chose to nullify the nominations made by Anupama. Karthik was directly nominated by Captain Riaz. Tejaswini walked out of the house due to her father's health condition. She re-entered the house a day later.
: An open nomination process took place in the garden area in Week 5. But Karthik exercised his Super Adhikara by nominating two people in the confession room. Captain Chandan had the power to save one nominated housemate, and he decided to save Riaz.
: On account of winning the General Knowledge quiz, Niveditha became the youngest captain in the history of Bigg Boss Kannada. Chandru was directly nominated by Niveditha for eviction. There was no eviction in Week 6. Krishi re-entered the Bigg Boss House as a wild card contestant.
: Karthik became the captain of the house. The housemates were asked to nominate two people whom they want to save this week. Diwakar was directly nominated by Karthik for eviction.
: Jagan became the captain of the house. Vaishnavi enters the house as a wild card contestant. Except for Jagan and Vaishnavi, all the other housemates are directly nominated for eviction by Bigg Boss. Vaishnavi exited the house on Day 54 due to recurring health issues.
: Krishi became the new captain of the house. While Lasya Nagraj entered the house as a wild card contestant, Samyuktha Hegde entered as a guest. Sameer was directly nominated by Krishi for eviction.
: Bigg Boss announced that a captain will not be appointed this week. The women nominate two male housemates; the men nominate two female housemates. Karthik exercised his Super Adhikara to directly nominate Lasya. Samyuktha was ejected from the house for assaulting her fellow housemate, Sameer.
: Riaz became the captain for the second time and uses his powers to directly nominate Diwakar. Jaya is sent to the secret room. Sameer is evicted in a surprise midnight eviction, but he too joins Jaya in the secret room.
: Diwakar is sent to the secret room. Riaz exercises his Super Adhikara to nominate Krishi, Anupama, Shruti, and Karthik. Sameer becomes the captain for the second time and directly nominates Anupama for eviction.
: Anupama becomes the captain and directly nominates Chandan for eviction. Shruti exercises her Super Adhikara to learn the nominations made by Chandan and Riaz.
: All the housemates are nominated for eviction this week. As a result, a captain was not appointed as well.
: Sameer was the last housemate to be evicted before the finale. As a result, Niveditha, Chandan, Shruti, Diwakar, and Karthik qualify for the finale as the Top 5 finalists.

References

2017 Indian television seasons
Bigg Boss Kannada
Kannada-language television shows
Colors Kannada original programming